Mordellistena cinereofasciata is a beetle in the genus Mordellistena of the family Mordellidae. It was described in 1882 by Smith.

References

cinereofasciata
Beetles described in 1882